Kurt S. Browning is a Republican politician and former Secretary of State of Florida. He currently serves as Superintendent of Schools for Pasco County, Florida.

Career 
Browning's political career began in 1975 when he started working in the Pasco County Supervisor of Elections office. In 1980, he was elected as the Pasco Supervisor himself, as a Democrat. At 22 years old, he was the youngest county elections official in Florida history. He served in that position for 26 years, until his appointment as Secretary of State. During that time, Browning also served as the President of the Florida State Association of Supervisors of Elections, as a member of Governor Jeb Bush's Task Force on Election Procedures, Standards and Technology, and as a member of the State Planning Committee for the Help America Vote Act. Browning changed his party affiliation to Republican in 2002.

Secretary of State 
Governor-elect Charlie Crist announced his appointment of Browning as Secretary of State in December 2006. Browning served in that position until April 2010, when he resigned to comply with state retirement pension compensation laws. While out of office, he was honorary chairman of the failed campaign opposing two anti-gerrymandering constitutional amendments on the 2010 ballot, the "Fair Districts" Amendments 5 and 6. He was re-appointed Secretary of State by Governor Rick Scott in January 2011.

During his two stints as secretary, Browning oversaw the state's defense of several lawsuits challenging Florida's voting laws. He also oversaw the transition from using touchscreen voting machines to paper optical scan machines, even though as Supervisor of Elections he was a strong advocate of touchscreen technology. Responsible for the Division of Corporations, which manages corporate filings, Browning eliminated paper records and instituted electronic filing for businesses, including a searchable public website.

Superintendent of Schools 
Browning announced his resignation as Secretary of State on January 11, 2012, effective February 17, 2012. Several weeks later he announced that he would run for Pasco County Superintendent of Schools. He was elected to that position on November 6, 2012, after defeating two-term incumbent Heather Fiorentino in the Republican primary.

First Term 
During his first term, the school district saw a dramatic decrease in school performance. Performance grades assigned by the state showed that:
 only three schools out of 79 raised their grade one letter, while 40 schools decreased one letter and 11 schools decreased by two letter-grades,
 there were 50 C or D rated schools in 2016, as compared to only 27 in 2012, and
 there was a near quadrupling of elementary schools on the state's low-300 list.
Browning made many questionable decisions during his first term, admitting that he tried to do too much, but often not well. One of which was to eliminate school literacy, media center and technology specialists, which he was later forced to rescind admitting he had removed too much expertise from the schools. A union president representing school district employees directly related this decision to the declining test scores evidenced during his first term. A school board member also charged him with removing too much institutional knowledge from the district offices, creating unneeded new levels of bureaucracy, and taking away creativity from teachers by mandating when they should teach curriculum standards and the need for quarterly tests.

Second Term 
Despite poor school performance statistics and questionable business decisions, Browning was reelected for a second term, running unopposed in 2016. Almost immediately, both school performance and his business decisions were again called into question. Preliminary graduation rates that were released in December 2016 showed that only four of 13 high schools in the district increased their graduation rate over the previous year. Also, while presiding over a contentious rezoning issue within two different areas in the school district, Browning suggested different boundaries to the school board than committees of principals and parents that were set up to study the issue of overcrowded schools recommended. Journalism students at Fivay High School actually called Browning out on his circumvention of Florida Department of Education’s Class Size Laws, reporting that their classes had 40+ students. Possibly due to the fact that local news stations caught onto this (and enraged parents started activating for his resignation on social media), Browning did not take it kindly. In fact, Browning showed up during school hours to tell the students they were spreading misinformation. Residents from both sides of the issue alleged bias during the process. Those arguments were given more credence when Browning himself admitted that he did not intend to alter the committee proposals, but then did so anyway, explaining that he made his comment thinking the committees would act differently. And once again, Browning had to walk back previous business decisions that he made, this time reversing the changes he made to his own administrative team in his first term, instead reverting to the more traditional model that he upended with his previous decision.

2020 Election

As the 2020 Pasco County Superintendent Election comes closer and closer, Browning‘s face was once again on social media posts activating for his resignation. The main reason for this wave of criticism was due to the fact that Browning demoted his main opponent David LaRoche, Principal of Hudson High School, to Vice-Principal at Mitchell High School. A move many Hudson High students and parents believed to be politically motivated, and one that was not in the best interest for their school’s growth. In addition to this, in his candidate interview in July, Browning was accused of making a racist remark. In the video Browning said, “I’m not talking about your super bright kids, I’m talking about your kids of color.” This was in reference to a question about the College Board awarding Pasco County to be their AP District of the Year. Pasco County students on Twitter explained their outrage by, once again, calling for his resignation - and suggested Pasco County voters vote LaRoche for Superintendent. Despite controversy, Browning overwhelmingly defeated LaRoche in the Republican primary and went on to win the General Election in November.

In June 2022, Browning announced he won't run for a fourth term.

Background 
Browning is a native Floridian. He received a bachelor's degree in political science and a master's degree in public administration from the University of South Florida. He has been involved in the Pasco County community for much of his career, including service as President of Downtown Dade City Main Street, Inc., and involvement with organizations including the Boy Scouts of America and the Pasco County United Way.

References

Year of birth missing (living people)
Living people
Election people
Florida Republicans
Secretaries of State of Florida
University of South Florida alumni
People from Dade City, Florida